Castrignano de' Greci (Griko: , Kascignàna;) is a small town and comune of 4,107 inhabitants in the province of Lecce in Apulia, southern Italy. It is one of the nine towns of Grecìa Salentina.

The inhabitants of Castrignano, alongside Italian, also speak Griko which reveals significant Greek influences over the course of time, presumably from the time of the Byzantine control, or even the ancient Magna Graecia colonisation in the 8th century BCE.

References 

Cities and towns in Apulia
Grecìa Salentina
Localities of Salento